Amrita literally means "immortality" and is often referred to in ancient Indian texts as nectar or ambrosia and carries the same meaning.

Amrita may also refer to:

Books 
 Amrita (Gujarati novel)
 Amrita (Yoshimoto novel)

Education 
 Amrita Vishwa Vidyapeetham
 Amrita Vidyalayam
 Amrita Learning
 Amrita College of Education
 Amrita College of Engineering & Technology
 Amrita Institute of Medical Sciences
 Amrita Lal Dey College
 Amrita Schools of Engineering

People 
 Amrita Acharia
 Amrita Agrahari
 Amrita Arora
 Amrita Basu
 Amrita Chattopadhyay
 Amrita Chaudhry
 Amrita Cheema
 Amrita Gogoi
 Amrita Hunjan
 Amrita Kak
 Amrita Lal Basu
 Amrita Meghwal
 Amrita Mukherjee
 Amrita Narlikar
 Amrita Patel
 Amrita Prakash
 Amrita Pritam
 Amrita Puri
 Amrita Raichand
 Amrita Rao
 Amrita Rawat
 Amrita Roy Choudhury
 Amrita Sawaram
 Amrita Sher-Gil
 Amrita Shinde
 Amrita Singh
 Amrita Thapa
 Amrita Thapar
 Amrita Virk
 Amrita Vishwa Vidyapeetham

Others 
 Amrita TV
 Amrita Island
 Amrita Bazar Patrika, newspaper
 Amrita Club
 Amrita movement

See also  
 Amrit (disambiguation)